Chao Ratchabut (เจ้าราชบุตร) can refer to:
Chao Ratchabut (Mokfa Na Nan)
Chao Ratchabut (Wongtawan Na Chiang Mai)